Woo Sung-yong (born August 18, 1974) is a former South Korean footballer.

Career statistics

Club

International goals
Results list South Korea's goal tally first.

References

External links
 
 

1974 births
Living people
South Korean footballers
Association football forwards
South Korea under-23 international footballers
South Korea international footballers
2007 AFC Asian Cup players
Busan IPark players
Pohang Steelers players
Seongnam FC players
Ulsan Hyundai FC players
Incheon United FC players
K League 1 players
Ajou University alumni
South Korean Buddhists
South Korean football managers
Seoul E-Land FC managers
Sportspeople from Gangwon Province, South Korea